J. K. Simmons is an American actor. He is considered one of the most prolific and well-established character actors of his generation. He has appeared in over 200 films and television roles since his debut in 1986 with film roles including J. Jonah Jameson in Sam Raimi's Spider-Man trilogy (2002–2007), Thank You for Smoking with Aaron Eckhart (2006), Juno with Elliot Page (2007), Whiplash with Miles Teller (2014), for which he won the Academy Award for Best Supporting Actor, La La Land with Ryan Gosling (2016), Commissioner James Gordon in Justice League (2017), and William Frawley in Being the Ricardos (2021). He reprised his role as Jameson in various Marvel Studios media unrelated to the Raimi trilogy, including the Marvel Cinematic Universe films Spider-Man: Far From Home (2019) and Spider-Man: No Way Home (2021), and the Sony's Spider-Man Universe film Venom: Let There Be Carnage (2021).

On television, he is known for playing Dr. Emil Skoda in the Law & Order franchise (1997–2010), white supremacist prisoner Vernon Schillinger on the HBO series Oz (1997–2003), and Assistant Police Chief Will Pope on the TNT series The Closer (2005–2012). From 2017 to 2019, he starred as Howard Silk in the Starz series Counterpart. In 2020, he had recurring roles on the miniseries Defending Jacob and The Stand.

As a voice artist, he is known for voicing Cave Johnson in the video game Portal 2 (2011) and its spin-off Aperture Desk Job (2022), Tenzin in The Legend of Korra (2012–2014), Stanford "Ford" Pines in Gravity Falls (2015–2016), Kai in Kung Fu Panda 3 (2016), Mayor Leodore Lionheart in Zootopia (2016), the titular character in Klaus (2019), Nolan Grayson / Omni-Man in Invincible (2021) and as Captain Putty in Chip 'N Dale: Rescue Rangers (2022).

Film

Television

Video games

Theatre

References

External links 
 
 

Male actor filmographies
American filmographies